Wang Wiset is a district (amphoe) of Trang province, Thailand.

History
The minor district (king amphoe) Wang Wiset was established on 15 July 1981 by splitting off five tambons from Sikao district. The first temporary district office was in the temple (Wat) Rat Rangsan, (also named Wat Ton Prang) opened on 2 November 1981.

Wang Wiset was upgraded to a full district on 21 May 1990.

Geography
Neighboring districts are (from the east clockwise): Huai Yot, Mueang Trang, and Sikao of Trang Province; Khlong Thom and Lam Thap of Krabi province; and Bang Khan of Nakhon Si Thammarat province.

Administration
The district is divided into five sub-districts (tambons), which are further subdivided into 70 villages (mubans). Wang Wiset is a township (thesaban tambon) which covers parts of tambon Wang Maprang Nuea. There are a further five tambon administrative organizations (TAO).

References

External links
amphoe.com

Districts of Trang province